South Pelaw  is a village in County Durham, in England. It is situated immediately to the north of Chester-le-Street.

See also
Pelaw

Villages in County Durham